Camilo Hernán Albornoz (born 24 October 2000) is an Argentine professional footballer who plays as a centre-back for Club Atlético Güemes.

Professional career
Albornoz made his professional debut with Atlético Tucumán in a 2-2 Argentine Primera División tie with Lanús on 23 February 2020.

References

External links
 

2000 births
Living people
Sportspeople from San Miguel de Tucumán
Argentine footballers
Association football defenders
Atlético Tucumán footballers
Argentine Primera División players